The 2014 ANZ Championship season was the seventh season of the ANZ Championship. The 2014 season began on 1 March and concluded on 22 June. With a team coached by Simone McKinnis, captained by Bianca Chatfield and also featuring Tegan Caldwell, Geva Mentor, Madison Robinson and Catherine Cox, Melbourne Vixens won both the minor premiership and the overall championship.  Vixens defeated Queensland Firebirds in both the major semi-final and the grand final as they won their second premiership. They won their first in 2009.

Transfers

Notes
  Sarah Wall previously played for Melbourne Vixens and Queensland Firebirds.

Head coaches and captains

Regular season

Round 1

Round 2

Round 3

Round 4

Round 5

Round 6

Round 7

Round 8

Round 9

Round 10

Round 11

Round 12

Round 13

Round 14

Final standings

Finals

Minor semi-final

Major semi-final

Preliminary final

Grand final

Award winners

ANZ Championship awards

Notes
  Kimberlee Green and Joanne Harten shared the MVP award.

All Star Team

Australian Netball Awards

Golden Bib Award
In 2014 the ANZ Championship introduced the Golden Bib Award which recognised the top attacker, top midcourter and top defender from each round. The award is determined on statistics and players earned two points for a goal assist and a point for centre pass receive.

Media coverage
All 69 matches were broadcast live on Fox Sports (Australia) and Sky Sport (New Zealand). SBS 2 also broadcast a live match every Sunday and showed weekly highlights of all the matches every Wednesday. In New Zealand, Māori Television also agreed a deal with Sky which saw Te Reo screen delayed coverage of one game from each round, plus the finals, on Tuesday nights. In Australia, National Indigenous Television broadcast  one match per week throughout the season.

References

 
2014
2014 in New Zealand netball
2014 in Australian netball